Coranus is a genus of assassin bugs in the tribe Harpactorini.

Species 
The following species are included:

 Coranus aegyptius (Fabricius, 1775)
 Coranus aethiops Jakovlev, 1893
 Coranus ambrosii Livingstone & Ravichandran, 1989
 Coranus angulatus Stål, 1842
 Coranus arenaceus Walker, 1870
 Coranus aridellus Malipatil, 1986
 Coranus atricapillus Distant, 1903
 Coranus bicoloratus Malipatil, 1986
 Coranus blandus Jakovlev, 1905
 Coranus callosus Stål, 1874
 Coranus carbonarius (Stål, 1855)
 Coranus carinata Livingstone & Ravichandran, 1989
 Coranus chanceli Bergevin, 1932
 Coranus cheesmanae Miller, 1958
 Coranus choui Lu & Cai, 1989
 Coranus contrarius Reuter, 1881
 Coranus dalyensis Malipatil, 1986
 Coranus decoratus Schouteden, 1932
 Coranus dilatatus (Matsumura, 1913)
 Coranus distinctus (Miller, 1951)
 Coranus dohertyi Miller, 1958
 Coranus dulichoides Villiers, 1965
 Coranus dybovskii Villiers, 1948
 Coranus elegans Schouteden, 1952
 Coranus emodicus Kiritschenko, 1931
 Coranus erythraeus (Stål, 1863)
 Coranus espanoli Wagner, 1950
 Coranus fieberi Puton, 1861
 Coranus flavicornis Villiers, 1963
 Coranus flavostictus Miller, 1941
 Coranus fuscatus Malipatil, 1986
 Coranus fuscilineatus Malipatil, 1986
 Coranus fuscipennis Reuter, 1881
 Coranus fuscolineatus Malipatil, 1986
 Coranus granosus Stål, 1874
 Coranus griseus (Rossi, 1790)
 Coranus guineensis Tordo, 1974
 Coranus guttatus Ren, 1984
 Coranus hammarstroemi Reuter, 1892
 Coranus hermelini Villiers, 1964
 Coranus kerzhneri Putshkov, 1964
 Coranus kiritshenkoi Bergevin, 1932
 Coranus lateralis Jakovlev, 1879
 Coranus lateritius (Stål, 1859)
 Coranus laticeps Wagner, 1952
 Coranus lativentris Jakovlev, 1890
 Coranus lindbergi Dispons, 1963
 Coranus lippensi Schouteden, 1944
 Coranus longiceps Bergroth, 1892
 Coranus lugubris Stål, 1865
 Coranus macellus Villiers, 1954
 Coranus madagascariensis (Signoret, 1860)
 Coranus magnus Hsiao & Ren, 1981
 Coranus marginatus Hsiao, 1979
 Coranus mateui Wagner, 1952
 Coranus metallicus Lethierry, 1883
 Coranus militaris Distant, 1919
 Coranus minusculus Breddin, 1912
 Coranus monteithi Malipatil, 1986
 Coranus monticolus Miller, 1950
 Coranus mucidus Schumacher, 1913
 Coranus mundus (Miller, 1954)
 Coranus neotropicalis Kirkaldy, 1909
 Coranus niger (Rambur, 1840)
 Coranus nigerrimus Miller, 1956
 Coranus nigritus Malipatil, 1986
 Coranus nimbensis Villiers, 1967
 Coranus nodulosus Ambrose & Sahayaraj, 1993
 Coranus nossibeensis Reuter, 1887
 Coranus oblongiceps Stål, 1865
 Coranus pallidiventris Villiers, 1948
 Coranus pallidus Reuter, 1881
 Coranus papillosus (Thunberg, 1822)
 Coranus parviceps Breddin, 1913
 Coranus pectoralis Jakovlev, 1883
 Coranus pericarti P.V. Putshkov, 1994
 Coranus persicus Wagner, 1952
 Coranus pirzadae China & Miller, 1950
 Coranus priesneri Miller, 1951
 Coranus pullus (Stål, 1855)
 Coranus reuteri Schouteden, 1910
 Coranus rubripennis Reuter, 1881
 Coranus rubrolimbatus Miller, 1950
 Coranus rugosicollis Puton, 1888
 Coranus ruthii Livingstone & Ravichandran, 1989
 Coranus sahlbergi Wagner, 1954
 Coranus sichuensis Hsiao & Ren, 1981
 Coranus siva Kirkaldy, 1891
 Coranus soosaii Ambrose & Vennison, 1989
 Coranus sordidus Miller, 1956
 Coranus spiniscutis Reuter, 1881
 Coranus squamipennis Miller, 1941
 Coranus stenopygus Putshkov, 1982
 Coranus subapterus (De Geer, 1773)
 Coranus sydnicus (Mayr, 1866)
 Coranus tagalicus (Stål, 1859)
 Coranus tibetensis China, 1940
 Coranus trabeatus Horváth, 1902
 Coranus tuberculifer Reuter, 1881
 Coranus varipes Stål, 1865
 Coranus ventralis Lethierry, 1880
 Coranus vestitus Villiers, 1972
 Coranus viduus Miller, 1950
 Coranus vilhenai Villiers, 1952
 Coranus villosus Miller, 1950
 Coranus vitellinus Distant, 1919
 Coranus westraliensis Malipatil, 1986
 Coranus wolffi Lethierry & Severin, 1801
 Coranus woodroffei P. V. Putshkov, 1982
 Coranus zibanicus Dispons, 1953

See also 
 List of heteropteran bugs recorded in Britain

References

External links 
 
 Coranus at Biolib

Reduviidae
Cimicomorpha genera